In molecular biology, CLRN1 antisense RNA 1 (CLRN1-AS1) (previously known as clarin 1 opposite strand, CLRN1OS or USH critical region pseudogene, UCRP) is a human gene encoding a long non-coding RNA. It was originally identified in a screen to identify the genes responsible for Usher syndrome type 3 and presumed to be an unprocessed pseudogene.

See also
Long non-coding RNA

References

Further reading

External links
 

Non-coding RNA